Indecipherable Text  couples the first two electronics-heavy releases, Lambent Material (2003) and Talk Amongst the Trees (2005), of Portland, Oregon ambient musician, Matthew Cooper, aka Eluvium, skipping over the solo acoustic piano of 2004's An Accidental Memory in the Case of Death. The two-disc compilation from Melbourne independent label, Sensory Projects, includes three bonus tracks not previously featured on any North American Eluvium releases.

Track listing

Disc One: Lambent Material
 "The Unfinished" - 4:38
 "Under the Water It Glowed" - 5:09
 "There Wasn't Anything" - 4:40
 "Zerthis Was a Shivering Human Image" - 15:35
 "I Am So Much More Me That You Are Perfectly You" - 5:49
 "Untitled 1 (For Piano)" - 4:07 [Bonus track]

Disc Two: Talk Amongst the Trees
 "New Animals from the Air" - 10:47
 "Show Us Our Homes" - 4:46
 "Area 41" - 0:59
 "Everything to Come" - 5:40
 "Calm of the Cast-Light Cloud" - 5:30
 "Taken" - 16:56
 "We Say Goodbye to Ourselves" - 2:09
 "One" - 7:44
 "Untitled 2 (For Orchestra)" - 5:33 [Bonus track]
 "Untitled 3 (For Rhodes and Tape)" - 7:52 [Bonus track]

References

2007 compilation albums
Eluvium (musician) albums